Owen McCafferty (born 1961) is a playwright from Northern Ireland.

Early life

Born in Belfast, Northern Ireland, McCafferty in 1961 he was brought up in London from the age of 1 until aged 10 when his parents returned to Belfast. He was educated at St Augustine's Secondary School, the College of Business Studies and then the University of Ulster where he studied Philosophy and History.

Career
His play Scenes from the Big Picture, originally produced in 2003 at the National Theatre in London, earned him the John Whiting Award, the Evening Standard's Charles Wintour Award for New Playwriting and the Meyer-Whitworth Award. It was the first time any playwright had won all three awards in one year.

McCafferty has also adapted J P Miller's Days of Wine and Roses but only used the skeleton of the original.

McCafferty's writing features the language and complexities, both comic and tragic, of Belfast life.  Like John Millington Synge, McCafferty's dialogue is highly stylized.

McCafferty is a member of Aosdána.

Plays
 I won't dance don't ask me
 Mojo Mickybo
 Cold Comfort
 Freefalling
 Shoot the Crow
 Closing Time
 Scenes from the Big Picture
 The Absence of Women
 Titanic (Scenes from The British Wreck Commissioner's Inquiry 1912)
 Quietly
 Unfaithful
 Fire Below
 Death of a Comedian

Screenplays

 Ordinary Love (2019)

Films based on his plays
 Mickybo and Me

See also
List of Northern Irish writers

References

External links
 

Male dramatists and playwrights from Northern Ireland
1961 births
Living people